Bến Nghé Channel(), also known during the French colonial as arroyo Chinois, is a waterway in Ho Chi Minh City. Very much an urban channel, the sides are said to be lined with "many grocery stores, rice processing factories, sawmills, oriental drugstores, and warehouses, all owned by the Chinese. They hatch[ed] eggs, salted fish and eggs, dried fruit ..."

References

Rivers of Ho Chi Minh City